Martin C. Windrow (born 1944) is a British historian, editor and author of several hundred books, articles and monographs, particularly those on organizational or physical details of military history, and the history of the post-war French Foreign Legion. His most notable works include The Last Valley, an account of the Battle of Dien Bien Phu during the First Indochina War, which was published in 2004 to "critical acclaim", and Our Friends beneath the Sands published in 2010.

Biography
Windrow was educated at Wellington College, a boarding independent school in the village of Crowthorne in Berkshire. He began working on commission as an editor of articles on military and aviation history in the 1970s. He is an Associate of the Royal Historical Society and the Foreign Legion Association of Great Britain.

Works
 Rommel's Desert Army, 1976.
 Tank and AFV Crew Uniforms Since 1916, Patrick Stephens Ltd, 1979, .
 The Waffen-SS, Osprey Publishing, 1984. .
 Inside the Soviet Army Today, 1987.
 French Foreign Legion. Men-at-Arms-Series; Osprey Military No. 300. Osprey, London 1996, .
 The Algerian War, 1954-62. Men-at Arms-Series; Osprey Military No. 312. Osprey, London 1997, .
 Military Dress of the Peninsular War, 1808-14, 1998.
 The French Indochina War 1946–54, 1998.
 French Foreign Legion, 1914-45, 1999.
 The World's Greatest Military Leaders, 2000.
 Warriors and Warlords: The Art of Angus McBride, 2002.
 The Last Valley, 2004.
  Not One Step Back, 2009.
 Our Friends Beneath the Sands, 2010.
 The Owl Who Liked Sitting on Caesar, 2014.

Notes

External links

1944 births
Living people
British historians
British military writers
British military historians
People educated at Wellington College, Berkshire